WPIL (91.7 FM) is a non-commercial radio station licensed to serve Heflin, Alabama, United States. The station is owned by Down the Hill Communications. It airs a mixed Southern Gospel/Classic Country/Bluegrass music format.

History
The station was granted its original construction permit by the Federal Communications Commission on July 5, 2000. The station was assigned the WPIL call letters by the FCC on September 6, 2002. WPIL was granted its license to cover on September 2, 2003.

On August 17, 2007, the station was struck by lightning which vaporized a portion of the broadcast tower leg.  This caused the collapse of the tower and destroyed the directional antenna system. WPIL applied to the FCC for special authority to broadcast temporarily from an available tower at the WPIL studio location until a new tower and antenna could be installed.  On April 30, 2008, the station resumed normal broadcast operations after completing construction and required repairs and upgrades.

Translators

References

External links
 

Southern Gospel radio stations in the United States
Classic country radio stations in the United States
Radio stations established in 2003
2003 establishments in Alabama
PIL